96 Drum 'n' Bass Classixxx is a studio album by Bogdan Raczynski. It was released on Rephlex Records in 2002. Raczynski has created a new artist name for each track, to give the impression that it is a compilation album.

Track listing

References

External links
 

2002 albums
Bogdan Raczynski albums
Rephlex Records albums